Trans States Holdings, Inc. is a privately owned holding company which owns and operates GoJet Airlines. The holding company is headquartered in Bridgeton, Missouri near St. Louis Lambert International Airport. The holding company formerly owned and operated Trans States Airlines and Compass Airlines until their cessation of operations on April 1, 2020, and April 5, 2020, respectively.

History 
Trans States Airlines was originally formed in 1982 as Resort Air, entering into an agreement with Trans World Airlines to operate feeder services in the states of Missouri and Illinois under the Trans World Express brand name. In 1989 the company changed its name to Trans States Airlines. GoJet Airlines was formed in 2005 by Trans States Holdings to operate feeder service for United Airlines under the United Express brand name using a fleet of Bombardier CRJ700 70–seat regional jets. In July 2010, Delta Air Lines sold Compass Airlines to Trans States Holdings as part of a cost reduction scheme, which included the sale of Mesaba Airlines to the Pinnacle Airlines Corp. at the same time.

Due to the economic effects of the COVID-19 pandemic, Trans States Holdings announced in March 2020 that Trans States Airlines would cease operations and close down on April 1, 2020, and Compass Airlines would also cease operations and close down on April 5, 2020, leaving GoJet Airlines as their only operating airline. Their maintenance hangar at Louisville Muhammad Ali International Airport also closed in April 2020.

Fleet 
Trans States Holdings operated an all-narrow-body regional jet fleet, totaling 29 aircraft. 

Trans States Holdings has operated a variety of turbo-prop aircraft since its inception, but has operated an all-regional jet fleet since 2006.

References

External links

Airline holding companies of the United States
Companies based in St. Louis County, Missouri
Holding companies established in 1982
American companies established in 1982